The New Zealand Solo Championship is an annual individual motorcycle speedway championship. The championship has been running since 1929 though it has only been running each year since 1958.

Unless stated, all riders are from New Zealand

Winners since 1929

See also
 Sport in New Zealand

References

New Zealand Champions list
Speedway New Zealand results archive
Books

New Zealand
Motorsport competitions in New Zealand
Speedway in New Zealand